Ronald J. Place is a retired United States Army lieutenant general who last served as the director of the Defense Health Agency. Previously, he was the director of the National Capital Medical Directorate of the Defense Health Agency. Raised in South Dakota, Place graduated from the University of South Dakota with a bachelor's degree in chemistry. He earned his medical degree from the Creighton University School of Medicine. His younger brother Major General Michael L. Place is also a military physician.

References

External links

Year of birth missing (living people)
Living people
Place of birth missing (living people)
University of South Dakota alumni
Military personnel from South Dakota
Creighton University alumni
United States Army Medical Corps officers
American surgeons
Recipients of the Meritorious Service Medal (United States)
Recipients of the Legion of Merit
United States Army generals
Recipients of the Defense Superior Service Medal
Recipients of the Distinguished Service Medal (US Army)
Physicians from South Dakota
20th-century American physicians
20th-century surgeons